The 2007 Giro d'Italia was the 90th running of the Giro d'Italia, one of cycling's Grand Tours. It took place from 12 May to 3 June 2007. The race began in Sardinia and finished in Milan, and featured five mountain top finishes, of which one was an individual time trial. The race also visited France and Austria in three stages.

Schleck also won the youth classification, which featured in the Giro for the first time since 1994. Di Luca's team dominated the overall classification, holding the race leader's pink jersey for 17 of the 21 stages.

During the race, Alessandro Petacchi tested positive for elevated levels of salbutamol at a doping control on 23 May, after winning Stage 11. Petacchi has a medical exemption to use salbutamol in the treatment of asthma, but the concentration of the drug in his urine sample from this control was above the therapeutically accepted level. Though the Italian Cycling Federation originally refused to punish him, the Italian National Olympic Committee appealed the case to the Court of Arbitration for Sport, resulting in a suspension for the rider and forfeiture of all his results from the Giro.

Teams

The Giro, along with the season's other Grand Tours (the Tour de France and the Vuelta a España), was one of several events run in 2007 as a UCI ProTour event but without a ProTour license. This meant that while ProTour points were awarded in the race, the organizers were not obligated to invite the 20 ProTour teams. Nineteen of the twenty ProTour teams,  being the exception, were invited, with three UCI Professional Continental teams rounding out the event's 22-team peloton. Each team entered nine riders, so the race began with 198 in total.

The 22 teams who took part in the race were:

Pre-race favorites

In the months leading up to the Giro, headlines centered on defending champion Ivan Basso. After having been removed from 's start list for the 2006 Tour de France due to his apparent involvement in the Operación Puerto doping case, Basso and Team CSC mutually agreed on the termination of his contract with them. He rode part of the 2007 season with Discovery, and had intended to seek overall victory both in this Giro and in the 2007 Tour de France with his new team. In April 2007, Basso's case was re-opened by the FCI, a step rarely taken on cases formally shelved. Facing further investigations into his involvement with the doping ring, team Discovery asked him to stop racing late in April. Shortly afterward, just two weeks before the Giro was to begin, Basso terminated his contract with Discovery, meaning the Giro started without its defending champion. Basso subsequently admitted to planning on doping in the 2006 Tour, and the FCI handed him a two-year suspension, with credit for time already served in 2006 after he was first connected to the doping ring. Paolo Bettini, the reigning world champion, wore bib number one in Basso's place.

Basso's removal left wide open the possibilities for overall victory in this Giro. Four former Giro winners started this race – Damiano Cunego, Paolo Savoldelli, Gilberto Simoni, and Stefano Garzelli – and they were expected to be among the favorites. Simoni's  team was noted to contain many strong climbers, including Riccardo Riccò and Leonardo Piepoli. The passage of the Giro over Monte Zoncolan, where Simoni won a stage en route to overall victory in the 2003 Giro d'Italia, was also noted as a factor in his favor. Further riders named as contenders included Pietro Caucchioli and Yaroslav Popovych.

The most high-profile sprinters lined up to begin the 2007 Giro were Alessandro Petacchi and Robbie McEwen. They, along with countrymen Mario Cipollini and Baden Cooke, had had a back-and-forth rivalry for sprinting supremacy that had gone back several years but had been stunted in 2006 when Petacchi missed most of the season, including all but the first three stages of the Giro, due to a fractured kneecap sustained from a crash. One pre-race analysis viewed Petacchi's 2007 Giro and season as a chance at redemption for him. Other fast men in the race noted to be contenders in the flat stages included two-time points classification winner Bettini, Danilo Napolitano, and Graeme Brown.

Route and stages
Race director Angelo Zomegnan commented that the route was designed to be easier than that of the extremely climbing-intensive 2006 Giro. The Giro's twenty-one stages were divided into the following classifications: three time trials (one team and two individual), eleven flat or undulating stages (officially there was no distinction made between flat and undulating), four intermediate stages, and three mountain stages. The race began with a team time trial on the island of Sardinia. This was followed by two flat stages and an unusually early rest day to transfer from Sardinia to Italy's mainland. The riders transferred by plane while the Giro caravan, race officials and team cars made the trip by boat. The final stage, as was tradition, was a flat, mostly ceremonial road stage to Milan, finishing with ten circuits on the Corso Venezia of the Via Montenapoleone.

There were three stages that began or ended outside Italy. Stage 12, the first high mountain stage, ended at the French city Briançon, a frequent destination for the Tour de France. The 16th stage ended at Lienz in Austria, and the 17th began there.

Five stages ended with climbs. The last mountaintop arrival was in the seventeenth stage, and featured one of the hardest climbs in the world, Monte Zoncolan. Though the number of mountain stages was small, it was nonetheless expected that it would take a strong climber to win the race.

Race overview

The Giro began with a team time trial on the island of Sardinia. Gasparotto faced intense questioning from his teammates and the media after not yielding first position to his team's captain, as is usual practice in a team time trial. Gasparotto yielded the jersey to Di Luca after stage 2, when Di Luca finished higher-placed in the mass finish, but took it back again after stage 3 when he contested the sprint and finished eighth. Finally, after stage 4, the six-way tie involving the Liquigas riders who finished together in the team time trial was broken, as Di Luca won the stage into Montevergine and took the pink jersey again.

Di Luca held the race lead until the conclusion of stage 6, which was decided by a breakaway. Luis Felipe Laverde and Marco Pinotti were the last members of a five-man morning breakaway still together at the finish. Since Pinotti started the day better-placed in the overall classification and became the new race leader because of their time gap over the peloton, he allowed Laverde to take the stage win. Laverde took the green jersey as mountains classification leader after the stage. The next three stages were flat and contested among sprinters and breakaways. This meant Pinotti was able to maintain his race lead with little difficulty, until stage 10, the Giro's next intermediate stage. The race's overall contenders showed themselves on this stage, with Leonardo Piepoli putting in a decisive attack  from the summit of the Santuario Nostra Signora della Guardia to claim victory by 19 seconds over Di Luca. Pinotti finished more than four minutes back, and surrendered the pink jersey to Di Luca's teammate Andrea Noè, who was tenth on the stage. At age 38, Noè was the oldest rider in the Giro and the oldest ever to lead a Grand Tour. Di Luca took the green jersey after this stage, his second stint in the maglia verde to go along with his two in pink. 's Andy Schleck took the white jersey after this stage by finishing third, after Di Luca passed him for second in the final kilometer.

Stage 12 into Briançon in France was the Giro's first high mountain stage, and it shook up the standings for the final time. Di Luca took the stage win, twice attacking from an elite group of five that had made the climb together. As Noè finished nearly ten minutes behind, Di Luca took the pink jersey for a third time, while still holding the green jersey. As Di Luca concentrated on winning the race overall, Piepoli took the green jersey after stage 15, the race's queen stage, topping two of that stage's climbs in first position. His lead in the mountains classification quickly became unassailable, and he won the jersey in Milan. It was also on this stage that 's Eddy Mazzoleni distinguished himself as a podium contender, taking a minute and a half out of Di Luca to move into second overall. Schleck lost time to Di Luca and Mazzoleni, but gained time over other riders in the top of the overall standings and stood third overall.

The last minor change to the top of the overall standings took place during stage 17, to Monte Zoncolan. The stage itself was conquered by the  duo of Gilberto Simoni and Piepoli. Since the climb had personal significance for Simoni, having won a stage there four years earlier, his teammate allowed him to cross the line first. Schleck, for his part, was third, just seven seconds back, and gained over two minutes against Mazzoleni to move up to the second step of the podium. Mazzoleni fell to fifth on this stage, but returned to the podium after the race's final time trial. Mazzoleni's teammate Paolo Savoldelli won the stage by a comfortable margin, but Mazzoleni took back nearly all the time he had lost on the Zoncolan stage and finished the race third overall. Di Luca was not seriously challenged after taking the race lead in stage 12, and comfortably won the Giro in Milan with a two-minute gap over Schleck in second.

Di Luca's team Liquigas was dominant. They took three stage wins, two with Di Luca himself to go along with the race's opening team time trial, and held the pink jersey for all but four days. With Alessandro Petacchi's disqualification (see below), Saunier Duval-Prodir took the most stage wins. Three of their victories came in the high mountains, with Piepoli, Riccò, and Simoni all winning high-profile stages. Iban Mayo added a breakaway win in Stage 18.  team leader Stefano Garzelli, a former Giro winner, also won two stages. The teams classifications and the classifications which awarded jerseys were all won by teams who had won stages, meaning eight of the 22 teams in the race took significant victories.

Doping cases
The most noteworthy doping case from the 2007 Giro involved sprinter Alessandro Petacchi. Petacchi took five stage wins, but after the third of them, he tested non-negative for salbutamol, an asthma medication which Petacchi has a medical exemption to use. Petacchi was obligated as the stage winner to give a urine sample to the doping authorities, and it had a concentration of 1,352 nanograms per milliliter of salbutamol, above the 1,000 allowed by the medical exemption. Salbutamol has anabolic effects at high concentrations. Team Milram placed Petacchi on immediate provisional suspension following the Giro, which kept him from participating in the Tour de France later that season as he had planned. The Italian National Olympic Committee (CONI) asked the Italian Cycling Federation (FCI) for a one-year ban for Petacchi.

The FCI refused to suspend Petacchi, and he returned to racing in late July. Their decision, however, was not made to exonerate Petacchi, but rather because they did not believe they should hear the case, instead deferring to the Court of Arbitration for Sport (CAS). The CAS heard the case, and Petacchi testified to the court, stating that the hot and humid day on which the stage was the run had made it so that he took several extra puffs from his inhaler, but that this was accidental and that most had come after he had already crossed the finish line and won the stage.

In its decision, the CAS ruled that Petacchi had likely not intended to cheat, but that he had not exercised the "utmost caution" it deemed necessary to abide by doping rules. Petacchi was suspended for a year, minus the time he had already sat out after Team Milram first provisionally suspended him, and his results from the Giro were all stripped. Team Milram subsequently fired Petacchi, and he was without a team until late in the 2008 season. While the court's decision explicitly stripped Petacchi of his results from this race, it does not seem that it granted those victories retroactively to other riders.

Petacchi was not the only rider identified as giving a non-negative doping test during the Giro. Reports emerged in June that three riders were under suspicion of doping, later identified as Petacchi, Leonardo Piepoli, and Iban Mayo. Petacchi and Piepoli both gave tests showing elevated levels of salbutamol, while Mayo's had abnormally high testosterone levels. Mayo was quickly cleared, as further testing revealed that his testosterone levels were of natural origin and that his team  had informed the UCI of this. Though Piepoli's level of salbutamol was, at 1,800 nanograms per milliliter, even higher than Petacchi's, he was cleared by his national federation of any doping charges in August.

Giro champion Danilo Di Luca also gave an irregular doping test, after stage 17 to Monte Zoncolan. The test, given spontaneously hours after the routine test Di Luca gave for being race leader at the time, reportedly showed hormone levels like "those of a child," causing anti-doping authorities to suspect that Di Luca was using some means to cover the presence of banned substances. These unusual levels were not present in the routine test, leading to suspicions that Di Luca had received an autologous blood transfusion between the two tests. A CONI commission later cleared Di Luca on the basis of insufficient evidence to conclude that he had doped.

Mayo and Piepoli would both test positive for erythropoietin later in their careers at the Tour de France, and Di Luca likewise at the 2009 Giro d'Italia, all leading to lengthy suspensions, while Petacchi made a successful return to top-level cycling and to the Giro in 2009.

Classification leadership
In the 2007 Giro d'Italia, four different jerseys were awarded. For the general classification, calculated by adding each cyclist's finishing times on each stage, and allowing time bonuses for the first three finishers on mass start stages, the leader received a pink jersey. This classification is considered the most important of the Giro d'Italia, and the winner is considered the winner of the Giro.

Additionally, there was a points classification, which awarded a mauve jersey. In the points classification, cyclists got points for finishing in the top 15 in a stage. The stage win awarded 25 points, second place awarded 20 points, third 16, fourth 14, fifth 12, sixth 10, and one point less per place down the line, to a single point for 15th. In addition, some points could be won in intermediate sprints.

There was also a mountains classification, which awarded a green jersey. In the mountains classifications, points were won by reaching the top of a mountain before other cyclists. Each climb was categorized, either first, second, or third category, with more points available for the higher-categorized climbs. The highest point in the Giro (called the Cima Coppi), which in 2007 was the Colle dell'Agnello in stage 12, afforded still more points than the other first-category climbs.

The fourth was the young rider classification, which awarded a white jersey. This was decided the same way as the general classification, but only riders born on or after 1 January 1982 were eligible. This classification was featured in the Giro in 2007 for the first time since 1994.

There were also two classifications for teams. The first was the Trofeo Fast Team. In this classification, the times of the best three cyclists per team on each stage are added, and the team with the lowest time is leading team. The Trofeo Super Team was a team points classification, with the top 20 placed riders on each stage earning points (20 for first place, 19 for second place and so on, down to a single point for 20th) for their team.

The rows in the following table correspond to the jerseys awarded after that stage was run. A year after the race, Alessandro Petacchi was stripped of all his results; this table reflects the stages and jersey awards he originally won.

Final standings

General classification

Mountains classification

Points classification

Young rider classification

Trofeo Fast Team classification

Trofeo Super Team classification

Minor classifications

Other less well-known classifications were awarded during the Giro, whose leaders did not receive a special jersey. These awards were based on points earned throughout the three weeks of the tour. Each mass start stage had one intermediate sprint, awarding points to the Traguardo Volante Garibaldi classification. These sprints gave bonus seconds towards the general classification, points towards the regular points classification, and also points towards the Traguardo Volante Garibaldi. This award was known in previous years as the Intergiro, and was previously time-based, awarding a blue jersey.  rider Mikhail Ignatiev won this classification.

Additional minor classifications included the combativity classification, which was a compilation of points gained for position on crossing intermediate sprints, mountain passes and stage finishes. Alessandro Petacchi was the original winner, but with all his 2007 Giro results forfeited, it appears there is no official winner of this award. The Azzurri d'Italia classification was based on finishing order, but points were awarded only to the top three finishers in each stage. Petacchi originally won this as well.

Also, the Trofeo Fuga Gilera rewarded riders who took part in a breakaway at the head of the field, each rider in an escape of ten or fewer riders getting one point for each kilometre that the group stays clear. Along with the Traguardo Volante Garibadli, Mikhail Ignatiev also finished first in this classification. Teams were given penalty points for minor technical infringements.  was not assessed any penalties, and so was the winner of the Fair Play classification.

References

Citations

External links
 
 cyclingnews.com – race reports and news features

 
2007 UCI ProTour
Giro d'Italia
2007
May 2007 sports events in Europe
June 2007 sports events in Europe